Bjørnemyr is a Norwegian village located on the west coast of the municipality of Nesodden. The Bjørnemyr Centre contains a grocery store, a hairdresser and spa, and a doctor's office. Recently a small mall was built not far from the Bjørnemyr Centre, which included a grocery store, a small café, a health store, and cutlery. The Sunnaas Hospital lies near Bjørnemyr. Bjørnemyr has an elementary school and a kindergarten situated right next to each other. 
Bjørnemyr Elementary School has a section for both physically and mentally challenged children.

References
 https://web.archive.org/web/20071027183136/http://www.oppvekst.nesodden.kommune.no/bjornemyr/index.htm

Villages in Akershus
Nesodden